Gateshead Metropolitan Borough Council elections are generally held three years out of every four, with a third of the council being elected each time. Gateshead Metropolitan Borough Council (which styles itself "Gateshead Council") is the local authority for the metropolitan borough of Gateshead in Tyne and Wear, England.

Political control
From 1889 to 1974 Gateshead was a county borough, independent of any county council. Under the Local Government Act 1972 it had its territory enlarged and became a metropolitan borough, with Tyne and Wear County Council providing county-level services. The first election to the reconstituted borough council was held in 1973, initially operating as a shadow authority before coming into its revised powers on 1 April 1974. Tyne and Wear County Council was abolished in 1986 and Gateshead became a unitary authority. Political control of the council since 1973 has been held by the following parties:

Leadership
The leaders of the council since 2002 have been:

Council elections
1998 Gateshead Metropolitan Borough Council election
1999 Gateshead Metropolitan Borough Council election
2000 Gateshead Metropolitan Borough Council election
2002 Gateshead Metropolitan Borough Council election
2003 Gateshead Metropolitan Borough Council election
2004 Gateshead Metropolitan Borough Council election (whole council elected after boundary changes)
2006 Gateshead Metropolitan Borough Council election
2007 Gateshead Metropolitan Borough Council election
2008 Gateshead Metropolitan Borough Council election
2010 Gateshead Metropolitan Borough Council election
2011 Gateshead Metropolitan Borough Council election
2012 Gateshead Metropolitan Borough Council election
2014 Gateshead Metropolitan Borough Council election
2015 Gateshead Metropolitan Borough Council election
2016 Gateshead Metropolitan Borough Council election
2018 Gateshead Metropolitan Borough Council election
2019 Gateshead Metropolitan Borough Council election
2021 Gateshead Metropolitan Borough Council election
2022 Gateshead Metropolitan Borough Council election

Changes between elections

1998-2002

2002-2006

2006-2010

2010-2014

2014-2018

References

 Gateshead election results
 By-election results

External links
Gateshead Metropolitan Borough Council

 
Politics of Gateshead
Council elections in Tyne and Wear
Metropolitan borough council elections in England